Halle Tecco is the founder of Natalist, adjunct professor at Columbia Business School, founder and former CEO at Rock Health, and an angel investor and philanthropist.

Education 
Tecco earned a BS from Case Western and an MBA from Harvard Business School, where she launched Rock Health as a student. She received her MPH at Johns Hopkins University with a concentration in Women's and Reproductive Health.

Career 
In 2006, Tecco founded a non-profit, Yoga Bear, which connects cancer fighters and survivors with online access to yoga classes designed for those undertaking treatment.

In 2007, Tecco co-founded Techammer with her husband. In 2017, they invested $10,000 in Bitcoin in 2013 and made $250,000 which they donated to cancer research.

In 2019, she founded Natalist, a reproductive health company focused on fertility and pregnancy products. Previously, she founded digital health venture fund Rock Health, where she was CEO until May 2016. Before that, Tecco worked in corporate finance and business development roles at Apple and Intel.

Awards 
Tecco was named one of San Francisco Chronicle’s Most Powerful Women in Technology (2014), Goldman Sach's Most Intriguing Entrepreneurs (2013), and Forbes 30 under 30 (2013).

Personal life 
Tecco is married to Jeff Hammerbacher, cofounder of Cloudera.

References 

Living people
Case Western Reserve University alumni
Johns Hopkins Bloomberg School of Public Health alumni
Harvard Business School alumni
American women chief executives
American technology chief executives
American health care chief executives
American women philanthropists
American company founders
Columbia Business School faculty
Year of birth missing (living people)
American women academics